The 2016 New York Democratic presidential primary was held on April 19 in the U.S. state of New York as one of the Democratic Party's primaries ahead of the 2016 presidential election. Hillary Clinton, who had previously represented New York in the United States Senate from 2001 to 2009, won a comfortable majority in both the popular vote and delegate count over Bernie Sanders, who was born in Brooklyn.

The Republican Party also held their own New York primary on the same day. Apart from that, no other primaries were scheduled for that day by either party.

Campaign
The week before the primary, Sanders drew large crowds to campaign events in New York City: 28,000 heard Sanders speak in Brooklyn the weekend before the primary and 27,000 heard him speak in Manhattan the week before. Clinton drew "appreciative crowds of respectable size" but did not approach the attendance of Sanders events.

In early April, ahead of the primary, former President Bill Clinton visited western New York twice for campaign events, speaking at an event in Depew (attended by almost a thousand people) and addressing a room of activists and volunteers at Clinton's Buffalo campaign office.

In total, the Sanders campaign spent about $2 million more than the Clinton campaign on television ads in New York. In terms of campaign-expenditures per vote, Sanders' campaign spent about $9.03 per vote, while Clinton's campaign spent about $3.62 per vote.

April 2016 presidential debate
A ninth debate was held on April 14, 2016 in Brooklyn, New York at the Duggal Greenhouse in Brooklyn Navy Yard. The debate was aired on CNN and NY1. Wolf Blitzer of CNN served as moderator.

Election Day irregularities
The New York Times reported the day after the primary:

The Brooklyn voter purge disproportionately affected Hispanic voters, and mostly voters between the ages of 30 and 80, and happened at similar rates in election districts where Clinton won and where Sanders won. Although 121,056 people voted with provisional ballots in New York City, the board threw out nearly 91,000 "either because their names were taken off the rolls or because their party affiliation had been dropped or switched to a different party without their knowing."

In November 2016, several groups sued the New York City Board of Elections over the voter roll purge. Initial parties to the lawsuit included "Lawyers Committee for Civil Rights Under the Law, Latino Justice/PRLDEF and Dechert LLP on behalf of Common Cause New York and several individual plaintiffs. In early 2017, both the Justice Department and New York State Attorney General's office made motions to join the lawsuit." In October 2017 WNYC reported that, pending court approval to the consent decree, that the New York State Board of Elections agreed to a settlement with parties to the lawsuit against them, admitting to illegally purging over 200,000 eligible voters from New York City voter rolls.

As a part of the settlement, the Board agreed to a series of remedial measures that will be in place at least through the next presidential election, November 2020 – pending court approval. The deal restores the rights of improperly purged voters and establishes a comprehensive plan to prevent illegal voter purges in future elections.

Opinion polling

Results

Results by county

Note: New York State is a closed primary state, meaning the turnout is based on active enrolled democrats by county on April 1, 2016. Blank, void, and scattering votes (BVS) are only for blank and void, since there was not other candidate on the ballot or the ability to write-in.

New York City results

Analysis
Clinton won a 16-point victory in her home state. Exit polls showed that Sanders won among voters age 18–29 in the Empire State, capturing 65% of this demographic, while Clinton won every other age group, performing better with older groups (53% of voters ages 30–44, 63% of voters aged 45–54, and 73% of voters aged 65 and over). Clinton tied men with Sanders 50-50, but won a 63–37 landslide among women (both married and unmarried). The candidates split the white vote 50–50, but Clinton won the African American vote 75–25 and the Hispanic/Latino vote 64–36. Clinton swept all income levels/socioeconomic statuses and educational attainment levels in her home state.

In terms of political ideology, Clinton won 62–38 among Democrats while Sanders won 72–28 among Independents, who were 14% of the electorate. Clinton won both liberals and moderate/conservative voters. She won among union households 58-42, and won both married and unmarried voters. In terms of religious affiliation, Clinton won Protestants 65-35, Catholics 62-38, and also won the Jewish vote by a 2 to 1 margin after Sanders caused controversy by criticizing Israel. Sanders won agnostic/atheist voters 57-43. While Clinton won voters who said Wall Street does more to help the economy, Sanders won among those who said it hurts the economy.

Clinton performed very well on Long Island and in the five boroughs of New York City, particularly in Manhattan, Queens and the Bronx; she also won handily in Brooklyn and Staten Island. Clinton ran up big margins in New York City neighborhoods like Harlem, where the percentage of African American voters was highest. Sanders did better in rural, whiter upstate New York counties, with Clinton winning Buffalo, Syracuse, and Rochester while Sanders won in Albany. Sanders also performed well in the Hudson Valley, with a high concentration of liberals and college students.

Aftermath
After winning her home state convincingly, Clinton told supporters, "New Yorkers, you've always had my back and I've always tried to have yours [...] Today together we did it again and I am deeply, deeply grateful."

Following his primary, a Manhattan attorney filed suit, seeking a temporary restraining order to block certification of the presidential primary election by New York City Board of Elections and the state elections board based on his argument that New York's closed primary system violated the state Constitution. This argument was rejected by the New York Supreme Court (the state trial court).

See also
 2016 New York Republican presidential primary

References

New York
Democratic primary
2016
April 2016 events in the United States
Controversies of the 2016 United States presidential election